Dr James McNulty AO Hon.MD(ECU) MB BCh BAO (Belf) DIH (Lon) DPH (Syd) FRACMA FAFOM (1926 – 27 January 2017) was the Commissioner for (Public) Health in Western Australia between 1979 and 1984.

Born in Belfast in 1926, McNulty came to Western Australia in 1956 and worked as a medical officer and superintendent at the Kalgoorlie Hospital. His career in occupational and public health included a 12-year term as Commissioner of Public Health and Executive Director of the Australian College of Medical Administrators.

McNulty was known for his contributions to the improved ventilation conditions in mining in Western Australia and his analysis and reporting of the working conditions and the health of workers in the Wittenoom Asbestos mine from 1959 until its closure in 1966.

Following his retirement from the Health Department in 1987, McNulty was appointed as an Officer of the Order of Australia in the New Year's Honours List of 1988 for services to medicine and health administration.

References

Australian public servants
1926 births
2017 deaths
Australian public health doctors